Charles Maurice Cabart-Danneville (14 June 1846, Paris – 24 July 1918, Paris) was a French politician.

Works
1895: La Défense de nos côtes. Paris: Hachette
1913: Les Poudres de la guerre et de la marine en France et à l'étranger. Paris: Berger-Levrault

1846 births
1918 deaths
Politicians from Paris
French republicans
Members of the 5th Chamber of Deputies of the French Third Republic
Members of the 6th Chamber of Deputies of the French Third Republic
French Senators of the Third Republic
Senators of Manche
Chevaliers of the Légion d'honneur